This is a list of the governors of the province of Jowzjan, Afghanistan.

Governors of Jowzjan Province

See also
 List of Afghanistan governors

Footnotes

Lists of governors of provinces of Afghanistan